Thymelicus is a Palearctic genus of skipper butterflies in the family Hesperiidae.

Species
 Thymelicus acteon (Lulworth skipper) - (Rottemburg, 1775)
 Thymelicus alaica - (Filipjev, 1931)
 ?Thymelicus christi (Rebel, 1894) - uncertain taxonomic status
 Thymelicus flavus
 Thymelicus hamza - (Oberthür, 1876)
 Thymelicus hyrax - (Lederer, 1861)
 Thymelicus leonina (Butler, 1878)
 Thymelicus lineola - (Essex skipper)-(Ochsenheimer, 1808)
 Thymelicus nervulata
 Thymelicus novus - (Reverdin, 1916)
 Thymelicus stigma - Staudinger, 1886
 Thymelicus sylvatica - (Bremer, 1861)
 Thymelicus sylvestris (small skipper) - (Poda, 1761)

References and external links
 Hesperiidae page from FaunaItalia
 Markku Savela's Lepidoptera and some other life forms: Preliminary species list. Version of 2006-DEC-31. Retrieved 2007-MAY-28.
 Thymelicus page from Russian-insects.com
 Images representing Thymelicus at Consortium for the Barcode of Life
 Fuller distribution

 
 

 
Hesperiidae genera